Jason Nicholas Doig (born January 29, 1977) is a Canadian former professional ice hockey player who played in the National Hockey League with the Winnipeg Jets, Phoenix Coyotes, New York Rangers and the Washington Capitals.

Early life
Doig was born in Montreal, Quebec. His parents, Michael and Paula Doig, immigrated to Canada from Jamaica prior to his birth for educational purposes, obtaining their degrees from Concordia University and McGill University, respectively. Doig grew up in Dollard-des-Ormeaux, a suburb of Montreal, where he attended St. Charles Elementary School, West Island College high school and Vanier College. Aside from hockey, he played soccer at a very high level with the West Island Lakers soccer club and was invited to play for Team Quebec.

As a youth, he played in the 1991 Quebec International Pee-Wee Hockey Tournament with the North Shore minor ice hockey team.

Playing career
The Montreal, Quebec native impressed in his youth with the North Shore hockey team in the QAHA then with Lac St-Louis Lions of the Quebec Midget AAA Hockey League before making his Quebec Major Junior Hockey League debut with the St-Jean Lynx in 1993-94. That same year, Jason lead Team Quebec to a gold medal in dazzling fashion at World Under-17 Hockey Challenge where he scored the tying and game-winning goal in the final game against Team USA. The following year he represented Team Canada at the World Under-18 Tournament in Mexico City - taking home the gold medal. He was chosen 34th overall by the Winnipeg Jets in the 1995 NHL Entry Draft after scoring 55 points and registering 259 penalty minutes with the Quebec Major Junior Hockey League's Laval Titan's and played in the Canadian Hockey League all-star game. In 1996 he was returned to the QMJHL where he led  the Granby Predateurs to the President's Cup - winning the coveted Guy Lafleur Trophy as the playoff MVP and then on to a Memorial Cup Championship where he was named as a first team all-star. That same year he was named team Captain for the West Team at QMJHL all-star game. The next year Jason was a member of Team Canada when it won the gold medal at the World Junior Ice Hockey Championships in Switzerland.

Doig played for the Winnipeg Jets as an 18-year-old in 1995-96 and remained with the franchise when it relocated to Arizona  in 1996-97 and became the Phoenix Coyotes. He then joined the New York Rangers in a trade prior to the deadline in March, 1999. The 6'3" blueliner played for the Blueshirts and saw action with the American Hockey League's Hartford Wolf Pack where he won a Calder Cup in 2000. The hulking blueliner played two seasons in the New York Rangers organization before he was dealt to the Ottawa Senators where he played only one season with the team's AHL affiliate, Grand Rapids Griffins.

Following his brief stint with the Ottawa Senators organization, Doig was acquired by the Washington Capitals in 2002-03 where he became a solid blueliner with the club while spending the early part of the season with the team's AHL affiliate, the Portland Pirates.

Following a season away from hockey due to the NHL lock out, Doig was signed as a free agent by the Vancouver Canucks and sent to compete with the club's AHL affiliate, the Manitoba Moose.

In the 2006–2007 season he played for Traktor Chelyabinsk in Russian Super League and finished the season in the Swiss National League A with the Langnau SCL Tigers. In that same year, Jason represented Team Canada once again at the Spengler Cup in Davos, Switzerland where the team won the Silver Medal. In the 2007–2008 season, he played in Switzerland with EHC Basel. He then signed a contract for the remainder of the season with the Norwegian top division team Stavanger Oilers. After Stavanger was eliminated from the Norwegian playoffs, Doig announced that he would retire.

Personal life
Since retiring in 2007, Doig became a principal with Los Angeles-based investment bank Park Lane, where he specialized on the hockey side of the business. While at Park Lane, Doig founded TreeVestors, an investment firm specializing in the development, origination and financing of social and environmentally sustainable carbon forestry projects. Currently, Doig is a Regional Sales Coordinator with Aflac, a Fortune 200 company specialized in supplemental employee benefits. Doig lives in Los Angeles with his three children.

Championships and medals
1993 Under-17 World Hockey Challenge, Team Quebec - Gold Medal
1994 Under-18 Copa Mexico, Team Canada - Gold Medal
1996 QMJHL President's Cup, Granby Predators
1996 Memorial Cup Championship, Granby Predators
1997 Under-20 World Junior Championship, Team Canada - Gold Medal
2000 Calder Cup, Hartford Wolfpack
2007 Spengler Cup, Team Canada - Silver Medal

Honors and awards
Under-17 MVP (1993)
QMJHL All-Rookie Team (1994)
Guy Lafleur Trophy (1996)
Memorial Cup All-Star Team (1996)
QMJHL All-Star Team (1997)

Career statistics

Regular season and playoffs

International

See also
List of Black ice hockey players

References

External links

1977 births
Living people
Anglophone Quebec people
Black Canadian ice hockey players
Canadian expatriate ice hockey players in Norway
Canadian expatriate ice hockey players in Russia
Canadian people of Jamaican descent
Granby Prédateurs players
Hartford Wolf Pack
Ice hockey people from Montreal
Manitoba Moose players
New York Rangers players
People from Dollard-des-Ormeaux
Phoenix Coyotes players
Saint-Jean Lynx players
Stavanger Oilers players
Traktor Chelyabinsk players
Washington Capitals players
Winnipeg Jets (1979–1996) draft picks
Winnipeg Jets (1979–1996) players
Canadian ice hockey defencemen